Serhiy Rozhok (born 25 April 1985) is a professional Ukrainian football midfielder.

After leaving Smolevichi at the end 2018 season, he has been playing for Ukrainian amateur teams in Kyiv Oblast league.

International career
Rozhok represented Ukraine at 2004 UEFA European Under-19 Championship and 2005 FIFA World Youth Championship.

References

External links
 
 
 Profile at FC Minsk website

1985 births
Living people
Ukrainian footballers
Association football defenders
Ukraine youth international footballers
Ukraine under-21 international footballers
Ukrainian expatriate footballers
Ukrainian expatriate sportspeople in Belarus
Expatriate footballers in Belarus
Ukrainian Premier League players
FC Dynamo-3 Kyiv players
FC Dynamo-2 Kyiv players
FC Obolon-Brovar Kyiv players
FC Chornomorets Odesa players
FC Desna Chernihiv players
FC Kryvbas Kryvyi Rih players
FC Minsk players
SC Tavriya Simferopol players
FC CSKA Kyiv players
FC Kharkiv players
FC Hoverla Uzhhorod players
FC Zirka Kropyvnytskyi players
FC Belshina Bobruisk players
FC Neman Grodno players
FC Vitebsk players
FC Gomel players
FC Smolevichi players